The 2020 African Sahel floods were extreme floods that struck numerous West, East, and Central African countries in August and September 2020 due to extreme rainfall. But over 760,000 people in Burkina Faso, Cameroon, Chad, Congo Republic, Ghana, Mali, Niger, Nigeria, Sudan, Senegal, and Tunisia  were affected and hundreds killed.

References 

West Africa floods
2020 in Burkina Faso
Natural disasters in Burkina Faso
2020 in Cameroon
Natural disasters in Cameroon
2020 in Chad
Floods in Chad
2020 disasters in the Republic of the Congo
2020 disasters in Ghana
Floods in Ghana
2020 in Mali
Disasters in Mali
2020 in Niger
Floods in Niger
2020 disasters in Nigeria
Floods in Nigeria
2020 in Sudan
Floods in Sudan
2020 disasters in Senegal
Natural disasters in Senegal
2020 disasters in Tunisia
Natural disasters in Tunisia
2020 disasters in Africa